Shen Chen (born 28 July 1990) is a Chinese sabre fencer.

Shen won a bronze medal in the 2013 and 2014 Asian Fencing Championships. In the 2013–14 season, she also earned a bronze medal at the Antalya World Cup and a silver medal at the Beijing Grand Prix. In the 2014–15 season she won the gold medal at the 2015 Asian Fencing Championships.

References

1990 births
Living people
Chinese sabre fencers
Chinese female fencers
Asian Games medalists in fencing
Fencers at the 2014 Asian Games
Fencers at the 2016 Summer Olympics
Olympic fencers of China
Asian Games silver medalists for China
Asian Games bronze medalists for China
Medalists at the 2014 Asian Games
21st-century Chinese women